
Year 721 (DCCXXI) was a common year starting on Wednesday (link will display the full calendar) of the Julian calendar. The denomination 721 for this year has been used since the early medieval period, when the Anno Domini calendar era became the prevalent method in Europe for naming years.

Events 
 By place 
 Europe 
 February 13 – King Chilperic II dies at Attigny (Ardennes), after a five-year reign. He is succeeded by Theuderic IV, infant son of Dagobert III, as Merovingian ruler of the Franks, under the control of the mayor of the palace, Charles Martel.
 Summer – Charles Martel restores the authority of the Austrasian palace throughout the Frankish Kingdom, including against Frankish-claimed Aquitaine and Provence (Southern France). He exiles Rigobert, bishop of Reims, to Gascony.
 June 9 – Battle of Toulouse: After besieging Toulouse for three months, Muslim forces under governor (wali) Al-Samh ibn Malik al-Khawlani are defeated by Eudes, duke of Aquitaine, preventing the extension of Umayyad control over Gaul.
 Anbasa ibn Suhaym Al-Kalbi is appointed governor of Al-Andalus, after the death of Al-Samh. The Muslims under Abdul Rahman al-Ghafiqi withdraw to Narbonne. The Visigothic duke Amrus of the Lerida area recognises Umayyad rule.
 Tervel, ruler (khagan) of the Bulgarian Empire, dies after a 21-year reign. He is succeeded by Kormesiy, possibly a son of Tervel, who is co-ruler and a descendant of the royal Dulo clan. 
 Prague is founded (according to legend) by Princess Libuše and her husband Přemysl, founder of the Přemyslid dynasty (approximate date).

 Britain 
 King Ine of Wessex defeats Prince Cynewulf, an unknown relation making a push for the throne of Wessex.

 Central America 
May 31 – Wak Chanil Ajaw (Lady Six Sky), who had been the regent for her son Kʼakʼ Tiliw Chan Chaak from 693 until his attainment of majority, becomes the new queen of the Mayan city state of Naranjo in Guatemala when K'ak Tiliw dies from unknown causes.  She reigns until her death in 741.

 China 
 Rains and heavy storms around the southern seaport of Yangzhou destroy over 1,000 ships and boats in the Grand Canal, during the Tang Dynasty (approximate date).

 By topic 
 Religion 
 Prüm Abbey is founded by Bertrada, daughter of former king Theuderic III, and her son Charibert, count of Laon (approximate date).

Births 
 Abul Abbas al-Saffah, Muslim caliph (approximate date)
 Fujiwara no Uona, Japanese minister (d. 783)
 Jābir ibn Hayyān, Muslim alchemist (approximate date)
 Tachibana no Naramaro, Japanese statesman (d. 757)

Deaths 
 February 13 – Chilperic II, king of the Franks 
 May 7 – John of Beverley, bishop of York
 December 29 – Genmei, empress of Japan (b. 660)
 Al-Samh ibn Malik al-Khawlani, Muslim general (approximate date)
 Ardo, king of the Visigoths (or 720)
 Eadfrith, bishop of Lindisfarne
 Headda, bishop of Lichfield (approximate date) 
 Liu Zhiji, Chinese historian (b. 661)
 Tervel, ruler (khagan) of the Bulgarian Empire
 Yao Chong, chancellor of the Tang Dynasty (b. 650)

References